

Nzema
Nzema may refer to:
Nzema people
Nzema language

Nzima
Nzima may refer to:
Sam Nzima (1934–2018), South African photographer
Sibusiso Nzima (born 1986), South African long distance runner

Language and nationality disambiguation pages